"Run for Cover" is a song by British girl group Sugababes. Siobhan Donaghy, Keisha Buchanan, Mutya Buena, Jony Lipsey, Cameron McVey, and Paul Simm all co-wrote the song for the band's debut album One Touch (2000). It was released as the album's third single on 9 April 2001 and reached the top 30 in Germany and the top 20 on the UK Singles Chart.

Song information
The song was produced by Lipsey, McVey and Simm. It received strong reviews from music critics.  The track is one of the group's darkest and most haunting singles to date. The lyrics describe escaping from the reality and harshness of the world, possibly an abusive relationship (you never seem to wonder/how much you make me suffer). It was released as the third single from the group's debut album One Touch in April 2001 and sold 64,242 copies. In 2007, Czech singer Tereza Kerndlová covered the song as "Zhasis" for her album Orchidej.
According to tunebat.com, the song is in the key of E minor and played at a tempo of 106 BPM.

One Touch 20th Anniversary Edition
On 11 May 2021, the Sugababes released a reworking of "Run for Cover" featuring singer MNEK.

Track listings

Notes
 denotes additional producer(s)

Charts

Weekly charts

Year-end charts

Release history

References

External links
 Sugababes.com – official website

2000 songs
2001 singles
London Records singles
Song recordings produced by Cameron McVey
Songs written by Cameron McVey
Songs written by Jony Rockstar
Songs written by Keisha Buchanan
Songs written by Mutya Buena
Songs written by Siobhán Donaghy
Songs written by Paul Simm
Sugababes songs